Li Junsheng (born 19 January 2000) is a Chinese swimmer from Beihai, Guangxi. He was diagnosed with cerebral palsy when he was one year old, which caused palsy of his lower limbs. At the 2016 Summer Paralympics won the gold medal in Men's 100m Breaststroke SB4, defeating Daniel Dias, who was swimming for Brazil, the hosting country.

References

2000 births
Living people
People from Beihai
Chinese male breaststroke swimmers
Chinese male freestyle swimmers
Swimmers at the 2016 Summer Paralympics
Medalists at the 2016 Summer Paralympics
Medalists at the World Para Swimming Championships
Paralympic swimmers of China
S5-classified Paralympic swimmers
21st-century Chinese people
Medalists at the 2018 Asian Para Games